On Monday, October 25, 1993, a Nigerian Airways Airbus A310 flight from Lagos to Abuja was hijacked by 4 teenagers aged 16 and 18.

Background 
Richard Ogunderu, Kabir Adenuga, Benneth Oluwadaisi and Kenny Rasaq-Lawal boarded the flight initially planned to fly from Lagos to Abuja containing top government officials including Rong Yiren, the vice president of China, and Nigerian government officials.

The hijackers had planned to divert the aircraft to Frankfurt, Germany. However, the plane needed to stopover for refueling in Niamey, Niger Republic. When the flight landed at the Diori Hamani International Airport in Niamey, the hijackers announced that the flight had been taken over by "Movement for the Advancement of Democracy in Nigeria".

The hijackers demanded that the Nigerian military-backed interim government resign and name Moshood Abiola as the president. The four hijackers said they would set the Airbus 310 on fire in 72 hours if this demand was not met.

After 2 hours of negotiations they freed 129 people, including Rong Yiren, from the plane and held back the crew and Nigerian government officials.

The four hijackers said they would set the Airbus 310 on fire in 72 hours unless Nigerian authorities agreed to their demands, which at first included the resignation of the military-backed government.

Not knowing how sophisticated the hijackers were in skill and explosives, the police could not initially attack the plane. After 4 days, the gendarmes invaded the plane and arrested the hijackers. A crew member was killed in the process.

Aftermath 
The 4 hijackers spent 9 years, 4 months in Niger prison. Shortly after the hijack, Ernest Shonekan's interim government was replaced by General Sani Abacha's dictatorship.

References 

Aircraft hijackings in Africa
Aircraft hijackings